Future War is a themed anthology of science fiction short works edited by American writers Jack Dann and Gardner Dozois. It was first published in paperback by Ace Books in August 1999. It was reissued as an ebook by Baen Books in June 2013.

The book collects ten novelettes and short stories by various science fiction authors, together with a preface by the editors.

Contents
"Preface"
"Second Variety" (Philip K. Dick)
"Salvador" (Lucius Shepard)
"Floating Dogs" (Ian McDonald)
"The Private War of Private Jacob" (Joe Haldeman)
"Spirey and the Queen" (Alastair Reynolds)
"A Dry, Quiet War" (Tony Daniel)
"Rorvik's War" (Geoffrey A. Landis)
"Second Skin" (Paul J. McAuley)
"The War Memorial" (Allen Steele)
"A Special Kind of Morning" (Gardner Dozois)

References

1999 anthologies
Science fiction anthologies
Jack Dann and Gardner Dozois Ace anthologies
Ace Books books